FIRST Res-Q, released on September 8, 2015, is the 2015–2016 robotics competition for FIRST Tech Challenge. In the competition, two alliances, each consisting of two teams, compete to climb a mountain and score debris in alliance specific goals. FIRST Res-Q is the eleventh FTC challenge game.

Alliances
In each Match, the four teams competing are organized into red and blue alliances. The members of an alliance compete together to earn points. A Match consists of a thirty second Autonomous Period followed by a two minute Driver-Controlled Period for a total time of two minutes and thirty seconds. Alliances are selected randomly prior to the start of each competition.

Field
The field for the competition is a square measuring 12 feet by 12 feet, which can be constructed by teams for practising prior to competitions. Mountains consisting of alliance-specific climbing areas and goals are located in two corners of the playing field. Alliance-designated Zip Lines extend from the top of the Mountains to the playing field wall. Two alliance specific Rescue Beacons in need of “repair” by autonomous robots are located on the playing field perimeter wall. At the beginning of each Match, debris, fifty 2-inch gold-colored plastic cubes and thirty 2.8-inch diameter white plastic spheres, is dumped onto the field.

Scoring
There are three sections to the game: the Autonomous Period, the Driver-Controlled (or Tele-Operated) Period, and the End Game. The criteria for scoring is different during each segment.

Autonomous Period
In the Autonomous Period, robots run autonomously for thirty seconds. Robots gain points by: “resetting” Rescue Beacons, delivering Climbers to a Shelter, parking on the Mountain, and parking in the Rescue Beacon Repair Zone or Floor Goal. 

Driver-Controlled Period
During the two-minute Driver-Controlled Period, teams can use standard gamepad controllers, each with two joysticks to operate their robots.

End Game
The final 30-seconds of the Driver-Controlled period is called the End Game. In addition to the Driver-Controlled period tasks, robots earn bonus points in the End Game by hanging from the Pull-up Bar on the topmost vertical section of the Mountain and claiming an All Clear Signal for their alliance..

Advancement criteria
During qualifiers, state championships, and super-regionals; teams advance using the following order: Inspire Winner, Winning Alliance Captain, Inspire 2nd place, Winning Alliance 1st pick, Inspire 3rd place, Winning Alliance 2nd pick, Think Winner, and Finalist Captain.  Winning lesser judged awards (Motivate Award, Connect Award, etc.) can play a part in the advancement order.

After qualifying at a state competition, teams advance to a "Super-Regional", consisting of teams from many different states. There are four regions in the United States, and each region has a "Host Location" where the actual competition will be held.

Game Location 
Res-Q was the last FIRST Tech Challenge game that designated a world champion on the robot field. After the Res-Q year, the competition held two championship games.

References

2015 in robotics